James Vernon McCoy (August 23, 1908 – November 4, 1988) was an American politician who served in both houses of the West Virginia Legislature. A Republican, Governor Cecil H. Underwood appointed him to the state senate after Brad Sayre's resignation in January 1957. He lost reelection to a full term to Paul R. Moore in 1958.

References

External links

1908 births
1988 deaths
Republican Party members of the West Virginia House of Delegates
Republican Party West Virginia state senators